Government General Degree College, Mangalkote  (also known as Mangalkote Government College), established in 2015, is the government general degree college in Purba Bardhaman district. It offers undergraduate courses in science and arts. It is affiliated to University of Burdwan.

Principal/Officer-in-Charge
Dr. Saurabh Chakrabarti

Departments

Arts

Bengali (Faculty: Keshab Chandra Saha H.O.D., Anamika Mukherjee )
English (Molla Hafizur rahaman H.O.D.)
History (Hirak Kumar Sinha Maha Patra H.O.D.Aritra Rudra)
Political Science (Madhumita Chakraborty H.O.D., Sk Sahafur Hoque)
Sociology (Pinaki Roy H.O.D., Sanchari De, Suchismita Das)

Science

Zoology (Faculty: Dr. Debraj Biswal, Animesh Mondal)

Botany (Faculty: Dr. Akash Kedia )
Chemistry (Faculty: Dr. Pradipta Kumar Basu H.O.D., Dr. Debasish Kundu, Dr. Dhrubajyoti Mondal)

See also

References

External links
http://mangalkote govt college

Universities and colleges in Purba Bardhaman district
Colleges affiliated to University of Burdwan
Educational institutions established in 2015
2015 establishments in West Bengal
Government colleges in West Bengal